"In a Broken Dream" is a song and single by Australian rock band  Python Lee Jackson featuring  vocals from Rod Stewart.

Released in 1972 it entered the UK chart in September, reaching number 3 in October. Stewart's vocals are not credited on the record label, although the popularity of the song can be attributed to his vocals and star profile.

Song history
The song was written in the 1960s by the group's keyboard player and singer, Dave Bentley. Believing his vocals were not correct for the song, Bentley brought in Rod Stewart. Before being successful with Faces or in his solo career, Stewart was recruited as a session musician for the song and paid by being bought a new set of seat covers for his car. Issued in October 1970, it did not make the charts. Re-released in 1972 following the rise to stardom by Stewart, the song reached number 56 in the US charts before greater success in the UK later that year. It reached No. 74 in Canada.

The song appeared on the soundtrack for the 1996 film Breaking the Waves.

Stewart re-recorded the song in 1992 with David Gilmour and John Paul Jones but did not release it.  The recording was eventually released in 2009 as part of The Rod Stewart Sessions 1971-1998 box set.

English band Thunder included a cover of the song on its 2010 remastered bonus disc of their 1995 album Behind Closed Doors.

The Python Lee Jackson version was later sampled in A$AP Rocky's 2015 single "Everyday", which credited Stewart as a feature and also guest starred Miguel and Mark Ronson. This original version was also included on the deluxe version of Stewart's 2015 studio album Another Country.

References

1970 songs
1972 songs
Rod Stewart songs